Littenseradiel is a former municipality in the northern Netherlands, known in Dutch as Littenseradeel. The municipality was formed on 1 January 1984 by a merger of the former municipalities Baarderadeel and Hennaarderadeel. On 1 January 2018, the municipality was dissolved and its territory was split between three other municipalities: Waadhoeke, which was established that day, Leeuwarden and Súdwest-Fryslân.

Population centers 
Baaium, Baard, Bears, Boazum, Britswert, Easterlittens, Easterwierrum, Hidaard, Hilaard, Hinnaard, Húns, Iens, Itens, Jellum, Jorwert, Kûbaard, Leons, Lytsewierrum, Mantgum, Reahûs, Rien, Spannum, Waaksens, Weidum, Winsum, Wiuwert, Wjelsryp, Wommels.

Topography

Dutch topographic map of the municipality of Littenseradiel, June 2015

References

External links 

Official website

Leeuwarden
Súdwest-Fryslân
Waadhoeke
Former municipalities of Friesland
1984 establishments in the Netherlands
States and territories established in 1984
Municipalities of the Netherlands disestablished in 2018